Pop-Up Adventure Play is a not-for-profit play advocacy organization founded in the United States with centres in other countries. It is also a registered charity in the UK.

History 
Pop-Up Adventure Play was first founded in the United States with support from Fractured Atlas in order to translate the  UK playwork tradition for use in the US.  It was later established as a Private company limited by guarantee, and then a charity, in the United Kingdom.  Its founding members include Morgan Leichter-Saxby, Suzanna Law, Sharon Unis, Anna Housley Juster, Daniel Bigler and Erin Davis.  Pop-up Adventure play held its first pop-up adventure playground in New York City in 2010.  There have since been over 300 Pop-Ups in more than 25 countries.

Programs 
Pop-Up Adventure Play advocates for "child-directed, open-ended play," hosts  pop-up adventure playgrounds, provides Playwork training and pop-up play support and free resources to other play organizations worldwide.

Pop-Up Adventure Play has held pop-ups in McCarren Park, in Brooklyn, Central Park and other parks in New York City, Northampton, Massachusetts, Port Clinton, Ohio,  Largo, Florida, Santa Clarita, California, Missoula, Montana, and elsewhere.  Pop-Up Adventure Play also opened a free "Pop-Up Play Shop" in  Cardiff, Wales, where children could play with recycled materials.

See also 
 Adventure playground
 Playwork

References

Further reading

External links
 Erin Davis (2012): The Land (documentary about an Adventure Playground, Wrexham, UK)

Organizations established in 2011
Non-profit organizations based in New York (state)
Playgrounds
Adventure playgrounds